San Felipe de Aconcagua Province is one of eight provinces of the central Chilean region of Valparaíso (V). Its capital is the city of San Felipe (pop. 64,126).

Administration
As a province, San Felipe de Aconcagua is a second-level administrative division, governed by a provincial delegate who is appointed by the president.

Communes
The province comprises six communes (Spanish: comunas), each governed by a municipality consisting of an alcalde and municipal council:
Catemu
Llaillay
Panquehue
Putaendo
San Felipe (capital)
Santa María

Geography and demography
According to the 2002 census, San Felipe de Aconcagua is the fifth most populous province in the region with a population of 131,911. At that time, there were 98,925 people living in urban areas, 32,986 people living in rural areas, 65,090 men and 66,821 women.

See also
Aconcagua (wine region)

References

External links
  Official link
 

Provinces of Chile
Provinces of Valparaíso Region